Oxford Archaeology (OA, trading name of Oxford Archaeology Limited) is one of the largest and longest-established independent archaeology and heritage practices in Europe, operating from three permanent offices in Oxford, Lancaster and Cambridge, and working across the UK. OA is a Registered Organisation with the Chartered Institute for Archaeologists (CIfA), and carries out commercial archaeological fieldwork in advance of development, as well as a range of other heritage related services. Oxford Archaeology primarily operates in the UK, but has also carried out contracts around the world, including Sudan, Qatar, Central Asia, China and the Caribbean. Numbers of employees vary owing to the project-based nature of the work, but in 2014 OA employed over 220 people.

The registered head office is in Osney Mead, Oxford, southern England; this address is also the base for OA South. Other offices are OA North in Lancaster, northern England, OA East in Bar Hill, Cambridgeshire, eastern England. Between 2007 and 2011, OA had offices in Mauguio (OA Méditerranée), southern France and Caen (OA Grand Ouest), northern France.

Oxford Archaeology South (OAS)

In the late 1960s, the recently created Oxford City and County Museum led the archaeological response to a development boom in Oxfordshire. However, the museum lacked the resources to tackle the rescue crisis alone. The museum's answer was to form independent excavation committees in response to specific development threats, starting in Oxford in 1967. These committees were registered charities with public benefit at the heart of their purpose. They employed short-term contract staff, supplemented by volunteer diggers.

Soon a number of committees were operating, which tended to have the same governing members drawn from Central and Local Government, Oxford University and local archaeological societies. They also competed for the same funds. A consensus rapidly emerged that this duplication was wasteful and that all the committees should pool their resources to provide a county-wide service for archaeological research, using the opportunities presented by development. Thus, the Oxfordshire Archaeological Committee and its executive arm, the Oxfordshire Archaeological Unit, came into existence in 1973.

In the following years, the company adjusted flexibly to changing conditions, and expanded outside the county (hence the change in name to the Oxford Archaeological Unit). It also became a limited liability company, adjusted to new funding streams, and it embraced new methods and technologies. The company began trading as Oxford Archaeology in 2001.

Recent notable excavations include the excavation of prehistoric flint scatters and a Roman bloomery at the Bexhill-Hastings Link Road, the medieval friary of Greyfriars at Westgate Oxford, and a WWI mass grave of Australian soldiers at Fromelles.

Oxford Archaeology North (OAN)
The Lancaster University Archaeological Unit (LUAU), together with its staff, became the northern office of Oxford Archaeology on 1 November 2001. This followed a decision that the needs of a professional archaeological unit could no longer be best served by its continuance within the university. OAN continued the wide range of work undertaken in the past, from desk-based assessments, through evaluation and rapid surveys of both the landscape and the built and industrial environments, to major excavations. Particular specialisations are upland survey and the excavation and recording of standing industrial remains.

OAN has taken the lead within OA on all archaeological projects carried out by the organisation throughout the north of England. OAN has worked on a great number of sites across northern England, and brought them to publication. These have included infrastructure projects on the A1(M), A66, the Asselby to Pannal and West East Link Main pipelines, and the Carlisle North Development Route (CNDR). OAN has also worked extensively on cemeteries and burials across northern England, including a Viking cemetery at Cumwhitton, medieval and post-medieval graveyards, and at Furness Abbey where a high-ranking clergyman was excavated. Since the North was the cradle of the Industrial Revolution, the investigation of factories, mills and workers’ housing also forms an important part of OAN's work.

Oxford Archaeology East (OAE)
In 2008, Cambridgeshire County Council's Field Unit, CAMARC, joined Oxford Archaeology as its third regional centre. CAMARC itself was a recently revised name for an organisation that had been given a variety of titles over more than 20 years of existence. Its lineage started in the early 1980s with Manpower Services Commission-funded community programme projects, and it continued to carry out developer-funded work in the mid-80s as the 'Archaeological Field Unit'.

OAE continues to deliver major programmes for infrastructure projects and for smaller-scale developments in both rural and urban areas. Its large rural landscape projects include complex Middle Bronze Age field systems, enclosures and settlements at Clay Farm, Trumpington. Recent urban schemes include the Itter Crescent Roman villa excavation in Peterborough and excavations of Victorian and Medieval settlement relating to Stourbridge Fair at Harvest Way, Newmarket Road, Cambridge.

Publication
Having published some 200 monographs, reports and booklets, Oxford Archaeology has established itself as a major publisher of archaeological reports with the production of monograph series, such as Thames Valley Landscapes and Lancaster Imprints, and contributions to other major series, including East Anglian Archaeology Reports. OA has also produced many ‘popular’ publications, pamphlets and booklets written in a less technical style.

List of publications:

Publications include Yarnton: Iron Age and Romano-British Settlement and Landscape, which describes the Iron Age and Roman occupation of a multi-period landscape on the floodplain and gravel terrace of the River Thames, Archaeology at the Waterfront: 1: Investigating Liverpool's Historic Docks, which presents the findings of the largest campaign of archaeological investigation yet undertaken along Liverpool's historic waterfront by Oxford Archaeology North and the National Museums Liverpool Field Archaeology Unit, ‘Remember me to all’: The archaeological recovery and identification of soldiers who fought and died in the Battle of Fromelles, 1916, which describes Oxford Archaeology's contribution to a joint Australian and British government mission, under the management of the Commonwealth War Graves Commission, to recover the soldiers and re-bury them with full military honours in a new Commonwealth War Graves cemetery in Fromelles, and Broughton, Milton Keynes, Buckinghamshire: The evolution of a South Midlands landscape, which reports on extensive excavations near the village of Broughton on the outskirts of Milton Keynes that revealed the fluctuating fortunes of neighbouring settlements from the Iron Age to the medieval period.

Oxford Archaeology has contributed many archaeology reports and research papers to county, national and period archaeological journals.

In addition, as part of its commitment to open access for archaeological data, Oxford Archaeology has developed the OA Library, an online resource used to disseminate digital material, including ‘grey literature’ client reports grey literature online, selected monographs, and supporting archives produced by Oxford Archaeology. It also makes available internally developed software on the Launchpad site under the umbrella project Open Archaeology.

Archaeological survey
Oxford Archaeology has incorporated digital survey techniques into its geomatics work. The most notable of these techniques is photogrammetric mapping, which uses photographs taken from an unmanned aerial vehicle (UAV) to create accurate three-dimensional models of the archaeological evidence, including artefacts, historic buildings or whole landscapes. Other techniques for data capture include differential RTK GPS, 3D laser scanning, Lidar and Total Station surveys.

During excavations by OAS at Westgate Oxford, the site of a medieval Greyfriars friary, three-dimensional models were generated through a combination of standard archaeological survey techniques and photogrammetric or structure from motion techniques. Photogrammetry and 3D modelling has not been confined to structures. The skeletons from a late Roman and Saxon cemetery at Cherry Hinton in Cambridge, excavated by OAE, were recorded using photogrammetry. UAVs have been used by OAN to map extensive landscapes, such as the former Greenside lead mine in the Lake District. The combination of a UAV, photogrammetry and detailed orthophotos captured the complex lead mining landscape, which comprised spoil heaps, mine shafts, wheel pits, engine houses, and trackways, among other remains. Oxford Archaeology uses a hand-held laser scanner that has an inertial measurement unit (IMU) and a small scanner mounted on top. These features allow the scanner to fix its location precisely and the surveyor to record the interior of a building in as much time as it takes to walk through it. Combining photogrammetry with the laser scanner also allows whole buildings to be recorded in 3D. OAN has employed the hand-held laser scanner to record Daisy Mill, a former Victorian cotton mill in south Manchester, and Lion Mill, a corn mill in Stonyhurst in Lancashire.

Charitable aims and outreach
A registered charitable trust with educational aims, OA has various outreach and community archaeology projects running alongside its commercial work. All three offices engage in outreach and public engagement, with a particular focus at OAE. Recent highlights include the volunteer dig at Maryport Roman settlement  and the Jigsaw Cambridgeshire project which trains and supports local archaeology societies across Cambridgeshire

References

External links
 Oxford Archaeology group website
 OA Library

Further reading
 Darvill, T (ed.) (2003). Oxford Concise Dictionary of Archaeology, Oxford: Oxford University Press. .

1973 establishments in England
Organizations established in 1973
Archaeological organizations
Education in Oxford
Organisations based in Oxford
Charities based in Oxfordshire
Departments of Lancaster University